Emilio Bigi (1 July 1910 – 28 May 1969) was the son of Elisa Bigi, from the Italian collectivity in Paraguay.

Childhood and youth 
As a small child, Bigi was part of the “Batallón de exploradores” (Explorers battalion), directed by the Salesiano priest Ernesto Pérez Acosta (Pa’i Pérez). Later, he played the bass in the Capital Police Band of Musicians.

Early moments 
Emilio studied the accordion, theory and solfeggio in the Paraguayan Athenaeum and later, the bandoneon. He played this instrument as part of the popular orchestra of Gerardo Fernández Moreno and other groups. He eventually formed his own orchestra. Bigi was part of the delegation of President Higinio Morínigo, in an official visit to Argentina.

Trajectory / Path 
Settled in Buenos Aires, continued to study theory and solfeggio, harmony, contrapunto (counterpoint) and piano, at the Academy Rubbione. Soon after concluding his courses, Bigi presented his thesis about “Variations about a Guarani subject”. Was temporally part of “Trío Guaireño” leadered by Gumersindo Ayala Aquino and later on, formed his own group. With this group he accompany several singers, being part of the Guaraní Folkloric Grouping, which had a prolific activity in the Argentine capital.
In 1952, he went on tour with Ayala Aquino, Carlos Federico Reyes (“Mita’i churi”) and Paty de Ayala. He moved to a San Cristóbal, Táchira, Venezuela. There, he worked as a musician and teacher. He also worked as a director in the Orfeón of the Alberto Adriani Institute, as a professor in the Music School Miguel Angel Espinel and as an instrumentalist of the Band of Táchira and the Typical Orchestra of the State.

Family 
He married Venezuelan Carmen Osorio. The couple had two daughters.

Last years 
He died on 28 May 1969, in San Cristóbal, Venezuela and was buried there.

Work 
Among his most representative work in erudite music, are found:
 “Cuarteto de cuerdas” (Spring quartet)
 “Aire Nacional Op. 3” (National air Op. 3)
 “Renacer guarani” (Guaraní resurgence)
 “Poema sinfónico” (Symphonic poem)
 “Aires nacionales para piano” (National airs for piano)
 “Canciones” (Songs)

In popular music outstand, because of their beauty and the success the accomplish:
 “Paraguay”
 “El suspiro” (Sigh)
 “Mimby pu”
 “Amanecer” (Sunrise)
 “Achuita”
 “Minero sapukai” (Miner song)
 “Pobre de mi” (Poor me)
 “La canción de mimby” (Mimby's song)
 “Mutilado en la guerra” (Mutilated in war). Lyrics by Rigoberto Fontao Meza.
 “Acosta Ñu”. Touching epic song, that enhance the heroism of the martyrs children that fought on August 16, 1869 the battle of the same name, in the last period of the Guerra de la Triple Alianza (War Against the Triple Aliace).
 “Teresita”
 “Por tu cariño, madre” (Because of your love, mother)

References 
 Centro Cultural de la República El Cabildo
 Biographic Dictionary "FORJADORES DEL PARAGUAY", First Edition. January, 2000. Distribuidora Quevedo. Buenos Aires, Argentina.

20th-century Paraguayan male singers
1910 births
1969 deaths
Guarani-language singers
20th-century Argentine male singers
20th-century Venezuelan male singers